Lower Domain Ground (also known as the Association Ground) was a cricket ground in Hobart, Tasmania, Australia.  The first recorded match held on the ground came in 1835 when Hobart Town played United Services.  The ground held a single first-class match in 1858 when Tasmania played Victoria, which in a 69 run victory for Victoria.  The last recorded match on the ground was between Southern Tasmania Cricket Association and the Australians.  The ground is now defunct as a cricket venue.

References

External links
Lower Domain Ground at ESPNcricinfo
Lower Domain Ground at CricketArchive

Defunct cricket grounds in Australia
Sports venues in Hobart
Sports venues completed in 1835